The Chardin Baronetcy, of the Inner Temple in London, was a title in the Baronetage of Great Britain. It was created on 28 May 1720 for John Chardin, son of the noted French-born jeweller and traveller Sir John Chardin.

Before 1741 he bought Kempton Park, Middlesex. He never married and the title became extinct on his death in 1755, his eldest sister's husband inheriting most of his probate assets who was Sir Philip Musgrave, 6th Baronet.

Chardin baronets, of the Inner Temple (1720)
Sir John Chardin, 1st Baronet (1687–1755)

References

Extinct baronetcies in the Baronetage of Great Britain